"It's Only Love Doing Its Thing" is a track featured on Barry White's album The Man. English soul band Simply Red later covered the song, under the shortened title "It's Only Love", as the lead single for their third studio album, A New Flame (1989). The Simply Red cover had its greatest success by charting at number one in Italy. The song was later featured in several greatest-hits albums and a ballad collection of the same name, and it remains a live favorite.

Elements from the song were sampled in "21 Questions" by 50 Cent. In 2008, the song was featured on Grand Theft Auto IVs fictional soul/R&B radio station The Vibe 98.8.

Overview
The song is a ballad performed by Soul singer Barry White on his 1978 album The Man, Elements from the song were sampled in 21 Questions by 50 Cent. In 2008, the song was featured on Grand Theft Auto IV's fictional soul/R&B radio station The Vibe 98.8.

Simply Red version

In 1989, English soul and pop band Simply Red released a cover as "It's Only Love'''" as the lead single of their third studio album, A New Flame (1989). This version had its greatest success by charting at number-seven in Ireland. The cover was later featured in several greatest-hits albums and a ballad collection of the same name, and it remains a live favorite.

Critical reception
Robin Smith from Record Mirror wrote, "Hell, sure has been a long time since we last heard Mick Hucknall crooning blissfully, but all good things are worth waiting for. 'It's Only Love' is a magnificent slow-burning track to cherish and savour, as Hucknall side-steps his vocals around some powerful instrumentation. It's nice to hear that Simply Red aren't merely regurgitating old ideas, and I can hardly wait for the album." William Shaw from Smash Hits'' said, "It's a low key re-entry into the giddy world of pop, none of Mick's over-the-top wailing, just a simple, catchy piece of their old fashioned "soul" that swings along in a most acceptable manner."

Personnel
Fritz McIntyre – keyboards and backing vocals 
Tim Kellett – trumpet and keyboards 
Chris Joyce – drums
Tony Bowers – bass guitar

Charts

References

1978 songs
1989 singles
Barry White songs
Simply Red songs
Pop ballads
Number-one singles in Italy